The 1978–79 Montreal Canadiens season was the club's 70th season. The franchise won 52 games and had 11 ties, but finished second overall in the league. The New York Islanders finished first overall by one point over the Canadiens. The Canadiens won the Stanley Cup for the fourth consecutive time, the 15th time in the past 24 seasons, and their 22nd overall. The Canadiens won the Stanley Cup on home ice for the first time since 1968.

Offseason

Regular season

Season standings

Schedule and results

Playoffs

|- style="text-align:center; background:#cfc;"
| 1 || April 16 || Maple Leafs || 5–2 || Montreal Forum || MTL 1–0
|- style="text-align:center; background:#cfc;"
| 2 || April 18 || Maple Leafs || 5-1 || Montreal Forum || MTL 2–0
|- style="text-align:center; background:#cfc;"
| 3 || April 21 || @Maple Leafs || 4–3 (2OT) || Maple Leaf Gardens || MTL 3–0
|- style="text-align:center; background:#cfc;"
| 4 || April 22 || @Maple Leafs || 5-4 (OT) || Maple Leaf Gardens || MTL 4–0
|-

|- style="text-align:center; background:#cfc;"
| 1 || April 26 || Bruins || 4–2 || Montreal Forum || MTL 1–0
|- style="text-align:center; background:#cfc;"
| 2 || April 28 || Bruins || 5—2 || Montreal Forum || MTL 2–0
|- style="text-align:center; background:#fcc;"
| 3 || May 1 || @Bruins || 1–2 || Boston Garden || MTL 2–1
|- style="text-align:center; background:#fcc;"
| 4 || May 3 || @Bruins || 3–4 || Boston Garden || Tie 2–2
|- style="text-align:center; background:#cfc;"
| 5 || May 5 || Bruins || 5-1 || Montreal Forum || MTL 3–2
|- style="text-align:center; background:#fcc;"
| 6 || May 8 || @Bruins || 2-5 || Boston Garden || Tie 3–3
|- style="text-align:center; background:#cfc;"
|  7 || May 10 || Bruins || 5–4 (OT) || Montreal Forum || MTL 4–3
|-

|- style="text-align:center; background:#fcc;"
| 1 || May 13 || Rangers || 1–4 || Montreal Forum || NYR 1–0
|- style="text-align:center; background:#cfc;"
| 2 || May 15 || Rangers || 6–2 || Montreal Forum || Tie 1–1
|- style="text-align:center; background:#cfc;"
| 3 || May 17 || @Rangers || 4–1 || Madison Square Garden || MTL 2–1
|- style="text-align:center; background:#cfc;"
| 4 || May 19 || @Rangers || 4–3 (OT) || Madison Square Garden || MTL 3–1
|- style="text-align:center; background:#cfc;"
| 5 || May 21 || Rangers || 4-1 || Montreal Forum || MTL 4–1
|-

|- style="text-align:center;"
| ''Legend:       = Win       = Loss

Player statistics

Regular season
Scoring

Goaltending

Playoffs
Scoring

Goaltending

Awards and records
 Prince of Wales Trophy
 Ken Dryden and Michel Larocque, Vezina Trophy
 Bob Gainey, Conn Smythe Trophy
 Bob Gainey, Selke Trophy
 Serge Savard, Bill Masterton Memorial Trophy

Transactions

Draft picks
Montreal's draft picks at the 1978 NHL Amateur Draft held at the Queen Elizabeth Hotel in Montreal, Quebec.

See also
 1978–79 NHL season
 1979 Stanley Cup Final
 The Game

References
 Canadiens on Hockey Database
 Canadiens on NHL Reference

Stanley Cup championship seasons
Norris Division champion seasons
Montreal Canadiens seasons
Montreal Canadiens season, 1978-79
Eastern Conference (NHL) championship seasons
Montreal